Cattaraugus Reservation is an Indian reservation of the federally recognized Seneca Nation of Indians, formerly part of the Iroquois Confederacy located in New York. As of the 2000 census, the Indian reservation had a total population of 2,412. Its total area is about 34.4 mi² (89.1 km²). The reservation stretches from Lake Erie inward along Cattaraugus Creek, along either side of NY 438.  It is divided among three counties for census purposes:

 Cattaraugus Reservation, Cattaraugus County
 Cattaraugus Reservation, Chautauqua County
 Cattaraugus Reservation, Erie County.

Background and location

A small cluster of Seneca-owned businesses are located along US 20 and NY 5 where they cross through the reservation. Facilities include a Bingo Hall, with a Poker Room and various video slot machines. Interstate 90 passes through the reservation; the closest exit is located in Irving, New York.

In Erie County, the reservation is bordered by the Towns of Brant, North Collins, and Collins; in Cattaraugus County by the Town of Perrysburg; and in Chautauqua County by the Town of Hanover. (At the reservation's southeast corner, near the village of Gowanda, it comes within a few feet of bordering the Town of Persia in Cattaraugus County.)

The reservation is mostly of a rural character, with one-family homes along Route 438 interspersed with businesses such as tobacco shops. The reservation is divided into several communities such as Newtown, Bucktown, Pinewoods, Eleven Acres, Ozarks, and Indian Hill. At the center of the reservation along Route 438 are the Seneca Nation government offices, a Head Start/Daycare Center, community buildings, and the volunteer fire department.

References

American Indian reservations in New York (state)
Seneca Nation of New York
Iroquois populated places
Geography of Cattaraugus County, New York
Geography of Chautauqua County, New York
Geography of Erie County, New York